The Barák Workers Association was a Czech educational organization in Austria during the interbellum years. The association was linked to the Czech National Socialist Party, and was an important pillar of the party in Austria.

References

Political history of Austria
Czech educational theorists
Czechs in Austria
Interwar period